Aname aragog is a species of trapdoor spider in the family Anamidae. It is found in the Pilbara region of Western Australia. The specific epithet is in reference to the spider Aragog in J.K. Rowling's Harry Potter books.

See also
 List of organisms named after the Harry Potter series
 Lycosa aragogi
 Ochyrocera aragogue

References

External links

 

Spiders described in 2012
Endemic fauna of Australia
Spiders of Australia
Anamidae